The 2012–13 Montpellier HSC season was the 39th season since the club was refounded.

Review and events

Competitions

Ligue 1

League table

Results summary

Results by round

Matches

Coupe de France

Coupe de la Ligue

UEFA Champions League

Group stage

Statistics

Appearances and goals
As of the end of the 2012–13 season.

|}

Transfers

Sources

Match reports

Other sources

Montpellier HSC
Montpellier HSC
Montpellier HSC seasons